Jacques Désiré Mairesse (27 February 1905 – 15 June 1940) was a French footballer who played as a defender. At club level, he represented FC Sète, Red Star, AS Villeurbanne, and RC Strasbourg. He earned six caps for the France national team and played in the 1934 FIFA World Cup finals. He was also part of France's squad for the 1928 Summer Olympics, but he did not play in any matches.

Mobilized in 1940, he was during the Battle of France taken prisoner by German forces in battle at Veron, then was shot and killed while trying to escape on 13 June 1940.

His son was Jacques Mairesse, the economist.

References

1905 births
1940 deaths
Footballers from Paris
French footballers
France international footballers
Ligue 2 players
FC Sète 34 players
Red Star F.C. players
RC Strasbourg Alsace players
1934 FIFA World Cup players
Olympic footballers of France
Footballers at the 1928 Summer Olympics
French Army personnel of World War II
French military personnel killed in World War II
French prisoners of war in World War II
World War II prisoners of war held by Germany
Association football defenders
Deaths by firearm in France
French Army soldiers
People executed by Nazi Germany by firearm